Men's Combined World Cup 1988/1989

Calendar

Final point standings

In Men's Combined World Cup 1988/89 all three results count.

Men's Combined Team Results

bold indicate highest score - italics indicate race wins

References
 fis-ski.com

World Cup
FIS Alpine Ski World Cup men's combined discipline titles